The Waldorf School of Mendocino County is a private school for children in Pre-kindergarten through eighth grade in Calpella, California, approximately  north of Ukiah.

Founded in 1972 by Linda Valenziano as Mountain Meadow Country School, it was originally located in Potter Valley and operated only as a Preschool/Kindergarten. The following year a first grade class consisting of eight children was added, conducted under Waldorf education principles. Additional grades continued to be organized in subsequent years, eventually prompting the move to its current location on the west side of Third Street in Calpella in 1979. Ms. Valenziano remained on the school's faculty until 1995 and was chiefly responsible for it becoming fully accredited by the Association of Waldorf Schools of North America in 1990, the only school in Mendocino County to do so. It currently serves over 100 students, the majority staying only for pre-K and kindergarten. Those who stay for first grade and beyond are taught using a mixed-age format where students from two grade levels combine to form one class, their teacher remaining with them all the way through the eighth grade before finally "looping back" to begin again with a new class of first and second graders.

The original move to the Calpella campus was only a lease for a single parcel with two buildings, the main one housing the administration and classrooms for the  through  grades and the smaller used for the preschool and kindergarten. As enrollment continued to grow the school was able to purchase the location in 1985 and began making improvements to the site, including a playing field and a large garden which remain centerpieces of the campus today. In 1996 they saw enrollment swell to its highest levels ever with over 170 students and bought the property opposite the main building on the east side of Third Street for use as a parking lot and the site of an Early Childhood Education complex they were preparing to construct. In 2000 the school retired its mortgage on the original site purchase from 1985 and in 2004 purchased the sole remaining lot on the west side of Third St., their campus now occupying the entire block.

Before the start of the 1999–2000 school year the school's community suffered a split when a group of teachers and several families whose children were enrolled there left to form River Oak Charter School in the Ukiah Unified School District.

The effects of the Great Recession were felt especially hard in Mendocino County, with many families no longer able to afford the costs of private school tuition and enrollment at the school fell below 100 students for the first time since the mid-1990s. A closure was narrowly averted in 2009, then from 2011 to 2013 it was forced to sell all of the land it had purchased but not yet made developments on to compensate for budget deficits. When the local economy's gradual recovery failed to see enrollment return to its previous numbers, the decision was made in 2014 to switch from traditional single-grade classes to the current mixed-age format with grades 1–8 being combined into just four classes that each had students from two grade levels. At the same time tuition was increased by 40% from $7,500 annually to the current rates which average $10,156 per year if a child attends from preschool to eighth grade.

Thanks to a $10,000 donation from a student's grandparents in 2017, the school has implemented an energy independence policy and on January 25, 2019, held a ribbon-cutting for a new 15 kW solar energy farm on the campus which now provides over 90% of the electricity used by the school.

References

External links 
 Waldorf School of Mendocino County

Waldorf schools in the United States
Private middle schools in California
Private elementary schools in California
Education in Mendocino County, California
Schools in Mendocino County, California